Metacetamol (developmental code name BS-749), also known as 3-hydroxyacetanilide and AMAP, is a non-toxic regioisomer of paracetamol with analgesic and antipyretic properties, but has never been marketed as a drug.

References

Analgesics
Acetanilides
Antipyretics
Phenols